Bryson is a given name which may refer to:

 Bryson of Achaea (fl. c. 330 BC), ancient Greek philosopher
 Bryson of Heraclea (c. 450-c. 390 BC), ancient Greek mathematician and sophist
 Bryson Albright (1994–2019), American football linebacker
 Bryson Baugus (born 1994), American voice actor for English dubs of Japanese animes
 Bryson Burroughs (1869–1934), American painter and curator of paintings at the Metropolitan Museum of Art
 Bryson DeChambeau (born 1993), American golfer
 Bryson Fonville (born 1994), American basketball player 
 Bryson Foster (born 2000), teen activist for development of treatments for muscular dystrophy
 Bryson Goodwin (born 1985), Australian rugby league player
 Bryson Graham (1952-1993), English rock drummer
 Bryson Head (born 1995), Australian politician
 Bryson Keeton (born 1993), American football cornerback
 Bryson Kelly (born 1989), American football player
 Bryson Joseph Louis (1925–2022), Dominican politician
 Bryson Potts (born 2002), American rapper known as NLE Choppa 
 Bryson Rash (1913–1992), American journalist and White House correspondent
 Bryson Stott (born 1997), American Major League Baseball player
 Bryson Tiller (born 1993), American musician and rapper

Fictional characters named Bryson include:
Bryson Bale, in the Marvel Comics Universe

Masculine given names